Diaa Jubaili ((Ḍīya Jubaylī); born 23 May 1977) is an Iraqi novelist and writer from the city of Basra.

Biography
Diaa was born in Iraq in 1977 in the city of Basra, where he is permanently based. He became a writer and novelist in an environment which did not afford him a traditional education and also writes articles about life in Iraq. An extensive reading of Western literature is an influence on his work. In his fiction writing, he focuses on questions of identity in Iraq as well as the tension between religion and nationalism.

Diaa has won literary awards for his writing in Arabic. In 2017, he won the seventh annual Tayeb Salih International Award for Creative Writing for his novel What To Do Without Calvino?. His  short story collection, No Windmills in Basra, won the 2018 Al Multaqa Prize for the Arabic Short Story. The large prize purse of USD$20,000 is to encourage the short story genre in the Arab world.

Bibliography in Arabic

Diaa has released eight novels and three short story collections in Arabic.

Novels/Novellas 
 2007: Curse of the Marquis  (لعنة ماركيز Lʿanat Mārkīz)
 2009: The Ugly Face of Vincent (novella)  (وجه فنسنت القبيح Wajh Finsint Alqabīḥ)
 2011: Bogeys, the Bizarre (novella)  (بوغيز العجيب Būġīz il-ʿajīb)
 2014: General Stanley Maude's Souvenir  (تذكار الجنرال ستانلي مود Taḏkār il-jinrāl sitānlī mawd)
 2016: The Lion of Basra  (أسد البصرة ʾasad il-baṣra)
 2017: The Cloven Man: Six Ways of Crossing Borders Illegally on the Way to Baghdad  (المشطور, ست طرائق غير شرعية لاجتياز الحدود نحو بغداد Al-mašṭūr, sittu ṭarāʾiq ġayr šarʿiyya liʾitiyaz il-ḥudūd naḥu baġdād)
 2018: Name Upon the Hollow, (الاسم على الأخمص Al-ʾism ʿalā al-ʾaxmaṣ)
 2019: Horse Cannon  (ساق الفرس Sāq ul-faras)

Short Story Collections
 2017: Widows' Garden, (حديقة الأرامل Ḥadīqat ul-ʾarāmil)
 2017: What To Do Without Calvino?, (ماذا نفعل بدون كالفينو Māḏā nafʿalu bidūn kālfīnū)
 2018: No Windmills in Basra, (لا طواحين هواء في البصرة Lā ṭawāḥīn hawaʾ fīl-baṣra)

Articles 
 2018 Sep 13, "Pollution and corruption are choking the life out of Basra", The Guardian
 Diaa has other articles written in Arabic.

English translations

Awards and honours

 2007:  Dubai Magazine Award for Curse of the Marquis
 2017:  Tayeb Salih International Award for Creative Writing for the short story collection Widows' Garden,
 2018:  Al Multaqa Prize for the Arabic Short Story for No Windmills in Basra,

In 2018, the short story collection No Windmills in Basra won the Al-Multaqa Prize for the Arabic short story. This is a description from the report of the Al-Multaqa Prize Jury: "The stories in Diaa Jubaili's collection vary in length from the very short to very long. They deal with the subjects of war by moving between reality and fantasy. With a sarcasm-laced narrative, he transforms the subject of war into a major introspective exercise on the significance of absurdity, nihilism, and a genuine desire to overcome the futility of death. The stories provide a reflection on the three wars of Iraq: the Iran-Iraq war, the 1991 Gulf War, and the 2003 American invasion, which set off a wave of extremism that is choking the country to this day."

References

Further reading 

Living people
Iraqi writers
1977 births
21st-century Iraqi novelists
Iraqi male short story writers